"I Want You Back" is a 1969 single by the Jackson 5.

I Want You Back may also refer to:

 "I Want You Back" (Bananarama song), 1988
 "I Want You Back" (Hoodoo Gurus song), 1984
 "I Want You Back" (Mel B song), 1998
 "I Want You Back" (NSYNC song), 1996
 "I Want You Back" (Pure Soul song), 1995
 "I Want You Back", a 1979 song by Graham Parker
 "I Want You Back", a song by Secret from the 2010 album Secret Time
 "I Want You Back", a 1984 song by Sherry Kean
 "I Want You Back", a song by the Kooks from the 2006 album Inside In/Inside Out
 "I Want You Back", a 2008 song by the School
 I Want You Back, a film released by Amazon Studios

See also
 Want You Back (disambiguation)